Sakina tul Sughra mosque (جامعہ مسجد سکینہ تو الصغری) is a mosque in Pakistan, located in Kotla Rehm Ali Shah, Jatoi Tehsil, District Muzaffargarh. Kotla Rehm Ali Shah was named after Syed Rehm Ali Shah who constructed a mosque at the same place about 200 years ago. Masjid Sakina tul Sughra founded by Syed Ismail Ahmed Hussain Bokhari, an Interventional Cardiologist in America. Sakina tu Sughra masjid is named after Dr. Bokhari's mother and aunt. Sughra and Sakeena laid the foundation stone of the new mosque on 31-01-2006. 

The Jamia is composed of a Mosque and School and serves as a community center where services are provided to the neighboring villages and free meals are given daily to anyone in the community. 

Jamia Sakeena-Tu-Sughra famous Masjid Situated 10 km from Jatoi city on Jatoi-Shah Jamal Road in Kotla Rehm Ali Shah District Muzaffargarh.

Design
The mosque is designed by Turkish architecture specialist. It has 52 domes and two minarets, each 55 meters tall. The total area of the mosque is 52 kanal. The mosque was completed in one a half year. The first Azan in the new mosque was said on 27 September 2007.

See also
Bhong Mosque

References

Muzaffargarh
Tourist attractions in Muzaffargarh
Mosques completed in 2007
Buildings and structures in Muzaffargarh